The Blue Room is the second studio album by rock band Union, released in 2000.

Reception
 Greg Prato of Allmusic reviewed the album for the site, and stated that the music was not as catchy as the band members work in their other bands.

Track listing

Personnel
Adapted from AllMusic.

Union
 John Corabi - Vocals, Guitar, producer
 Brent Fitz - Drums
 Jamie Hunting - Bass
 Bruce Kulick - Guitar, Co-lead vocals on "Dear Friend", producer

Production
 Stephan Hanuman - Engineer
 Bob Marlette - Producer, Engineer, Mixing
 Don C. Tyler - Mastering
 German Villacorta - Assistant Engineer

References

2000 albums
Albums produced by Bob Marlette
Spitfire Records albums